Olga Mikhailovna Ostroumova (born 21 September 1947) is a Soviet and Russian theater and film actress. Best known for her roles in films We'll Live Till Monday (1968, her debut), The Dawns Here Are Quiet (1972, Italian Silver Nymph Award), Vasily and Vasilisa (1981). 

In 1979 Olga Ostroumova was awarded the USSR State Prize; in 1993 - the title People's Artist of Russia.

Biography
Olga Ostroumova was born in Buguruslan, Orenburg Oblast, Russian SFSR, Soviet Union. In 1970, she graduated from the Russian Academy of Theatre Arts in Moscow. Her film debut as a high school student in Monday Sure Will Come (Доживём до понедельника, 1968) brought her immediate fame among Soviet audiences.

From 1973 to 1983, she worked at the Moscow Theater on Malaya Bronnaya, then moved to Mossovet Theatre, continuing her stage work alongside film and later television roles. She was awarded the title of People's Artist of Russia in 1993. Ostroumova is married to Russian actor Valentin Gaft. She lives and works in Moscow.

Select filmography
 1968 We'll Live Till Monday as Rita Cherkasova, a pupil
 1971 Sea on Fire as Yulia Prihodko
 1972 The Dawns Here Are Quiet as Zhenya Komelkowa
 1974 Earthly Love as Manya
 1977 Destiny as Manya Polivanova
 1979 The Garage as Marina
 1981 Vasili and Vasilisa as Vasilisa
 1983 Crazy Day of Engineer Barkasov as Sofochka
 1987 Tower as Kara Semenovna
 1987 Filer as Nina
 1997 Don't Play the Fool as Polina
 2003-2004 Poor Nastya (TV series) as Maria Alekseyevna Dolgorukaya
 2004 Women in a game without rules (TV series) as Maria Petrovna Gromova
 2005-2006 Don't Be Born Pretty (TV series) as Margarita Zhdanova
 2008 Admiral as Daria Fedorovna Kamenskaya
 2008 One Night of Love as Daria Matveevna Urusova
 2012 Yefrosinya (TV series) as Olimpiada Zhuravskaya
 2014 Pope to Sofia (Mini-series) as Marina

References

External links

Olga Ostroumova at rusactors.ru
 Olga Ostroumova bio at Lifeactor.ru 

1947 births
Soviet actresses
Living people
Russian film actresses
20th-century Russian actresses
Recipients of the Order of Honour (Russia)
People's Artists of Russia
Recipients of the USSR State Prize
Russian Academy of Theatre Arts alumni